The 120th Infantry Brigade is an AC/RC unit based at Fort Hood, Texas. The unit falls under command of First Army Division West and validates United States Army Reserve & National Guard forces capability to execute operations in support of FORSCOM approved and Combatant Commander requirements.

Lineage
 Constituted 26 March 1943 in the Army of the United States as Headquarters, 3d Armored Infantry Group
 Activated 31 March 1943 at Camp Chaffee, Arkansas
 Reorganized and redesignated 30 March 1943 as Headquarters, 3d Armored Group
 Reorganized and redesignated 14 September 1943 as Headquarters, 12th Tank Group
 Reorganized and redesignated 13 December 1943 as Headquarters, 12th Armored Group
 Inactivated 20 October 1945 at Camp Gruber, Oklahoma
 Disbanded 2 July 1952
 Reconstituted 24 October 1997 in the Regular Army as Headquarters, 120th Infantry Brigade, and activated at Fort Sam Houston, Texas
 Inactivated 16 October 1999 at Fort Sam Houston, Texas
 Activated 1 December 2006 at Fort Sam Houston, Texas

Campaign streamers

Unit Decorations

History
The Department of the Army originally constituted our current organization 26 March 1943 as Headquarters, 3rd Armored Infantry Group. This organization was subsequently reorganized and re-designated as the headquarters, 3rd Armored Group on 30 March 1943. The Army activated Headquarters, 3rd Armored Group at Fort Chaffee, Arkansas, on 31 March 1943.
This organization reorganized and re-designated as Headquarters, 12th Tank Group on 14 September 1943.

The Army once again reorganized and re-designated our current organization as the 12th Armored Group on 13 December 1943 for service in World War II. The 12th Armored Group participated in the Ardennes-Alsace, Rhineland, and Central Europe Campaigns and was awarded the Presidential Unit Citation for actions during the Battle of Bastogne.

After World War II, the Army redeployed the 12th Armored Group to Camp Gruber, Oklahoma, where it was deactivated during October 1945.

The Army merged the Readiness Group Fort Sam Houston and 3rd Regional Training Brigade to become the 120th Infantry Brigade during October 1997. The Army designated the 120th Infantry Brigade as the Training Support Brigade whose mission encompassed both the Readiness Group and the Readiness Training Brigade: training supervision and training evaluation.

The Army tasked the 120th Infantry Brigade with providing training support to National Guard and Army Reserve units. The 120th Infantry Brigade trained and evaluated National Guard and Reserve units at the National Maneuver Training Centers, Annual Training, and Individual Drill Weekends.

The Army re-designated the 120th Infantry Brigade as the 2nd Brigade, 75th Training Division at Fort Sam Houston, Texas, on 16 October 1999.

The Army reactivated the 120th Infantry Brigade on 1 December 2006 to serve the nation once again at Fort Sam Houston, Texas.

The Army moved the 120th Infantry Brigade to Fort Hood, Texas, on 1 September 2008 with a mission of providing post mobilization training to Army Reserve and National Guard Soldiers deploying to support the Global War on Terrorism

Organization
The unit is composed of:
Headquarters & Headquarters Company, 120th Infantry Brigade
  3rd Battalion, 289th Infantry Regiment (CS/CSS) Beaumont, Texas
  1st Battalion, 382nd Infantry Regiment (CS/CSS)
  2nd Battalion, 382nd Infantry Regiment (CS/CSS)
  3rd Battalion, 382nd Infantry Regiment (CS/CSS)
  2nd Battalion, 393rd Infantry Regiment Fort Hood, Texas
  2nd Battalion, 395th Field Artillery Regiment Fort Hood, Texas

Heraldry
Distinctive unit insignia: The dark blue, the color traditionally used by the Infantry unit, denotes the Presidential Unit Citation awarded to the unit. The arched band refers to the unit's World War II campaign in the Battle of the Bulge. The caltrops represent the defensive success by the Allies to protect Bastogne, Belgium from the German Army. The field of Gutte de Sang symbolizes the Battle of Ardennes, Siege of Bastogne, one of the bloodiest conflicts during World War II.
Shoulder sleeve insignia: The flag blue of the shoulder sleeve insignia is the color traditionally associated with Infantry units. The embattled pale suggests tank tracks, denoting the 120th Infantry's lineage as an armored unit. Red symbolizes the Brigade's striking capabilities. The bayonet signifies close combat, illustrating the Brigade's mission.

References

 The Institute of Heraldry: 120th Infantry Brigade
 Commander's Challenge article
 Brigade Homepage

120
Military units and formations established in 1943